Mahadeva may refer to:

Religion
Mahadeva, a title of the Hindu god Shiva
Parashiva, a form of Shiva
Parameshwara (god), a form of Shiva
Para Brahman, a Hindu deity
Adi-Buddha, in Buddhism, the "First Buddha" or the "Primordial Buddha"
Mahadeva (Buddhism), founder of the Caitika school of Indian Buddhism or a literary figure associated with 5 points of contention in some Theravada works
Taidi, in Chinese folk religion

People with the name 
Mahadeva (Buddhism), founder of the Caitika school of Indian Buddhism or a literary figure associated with 5 points of contention in some Theravada works
Mahadeva (Kakatiya dynasty), 12th-century ruler of India
Mahadeva of Devagiri, a 13th-century ruler of the Yadava dynasty of India
Mahadeva (undertaker), a recipient of the Chief Minister's gold medal from the city of Bangalore, India
Mahadeva Iyer Ganapati (1903–1976), Indian engineer
Arunachalam Mahadeva (1885–1969), Ceylon Tamil lawyer, politician and diplomat
Baku Mahadeva (1921–2013), Sri Lankan Tamil civil servant
Devanur Mahadeva (born 1948), Indian writer and public intellectual
Kumar Mahadeva, Sri Lankan American businessman
S. Mahadeva (1893–?), Ceylon Tamil civil engineer
Mahadeva Subramania Mani (1908–2003), Indian entomologist

Places
Mahadeva, Barabanki, Nepal
Mahadeva, Kosi, Nepal
Mahadeva, Sagarmatha, Nepal

See also
 Mahadev (disambiguation)
 Mahadevan (disambiguation)
Bolton v Mahadeva, an English contract law case